Vaduj is a major town in Satara district of Maharashtra, India. It is the headquarters of Khatav Taluka. It is the biggest town in Khatav Taluka, with a population of around 32,636 (registered )  people. According to the 2011 population census, it has a literacy rate of  86%, which is above the national average. Recently, its status was changed to Nagar Panchayat .

Location and markets

Vaduj is large town and is located on the bank of "Yerala" River in Maharashtra (Ancient : Vedavati). Its emerging markets attract various people from surrounding villages. The main market area, known as peth. Vaduj having very high markets due to nearest villages are totally dependent on Vaduj. Vaduj is the Administrative center of Khatav Taluka.

Geography
Vaduj is a Nagar Panchayat and located in the Satara district of Maharashtra state, India.

The major surrounding villages and their distance from Vaduj are Ganeshwadi 2 km, Satewadi 3 km,  Pedgaon 6 km, Wakeshwar 5 km Katarkhatav 8 km, Tadavale 9 km,  Ambavade 12 km,  Bhurakavadi 7 km and Pusegaon 19 km.

Languages
The language in Vaduj is Marathi, and it is spoken by most of the native population.

Education

Major public schools
 Hutatma Parshuram Vidyalaya (HPV)
 Chhatrapati Shivaji High School (CSHV)
 Chhatrapati Shivaji Polytechnics, Vaduj
 Arts & Commerce College Vaduj
 Gurukul
 Sevagiri English Medium School
 Cambridge High School
 Nutan Prathamik Shala

Colleges
 HPV Jr. College.
 Shivaji Polytechnic.
 Shivaji Science and Jr. College.
 Arts & Commerce College.

Transport

Vaduj is well connected by two state highways (SH): Karad–Pandharpur and Baramati–Sangli. The MSRTC main depot is located at Vaduj. Various buses are available to reach major cities like Satara, Pune and state capital Mumbai.

The nearest railway stations to Vaduj are Rahimatpur 30km and Koregaon 34km.

Culture
People in Vaduj are of diverse religions and celebrate religious festivals like Diwali,Gram-Daivat Bhairavnath Yatra/Jatra for 4 days, Basweshwar Jayanti, Dnyaneshwar-Parayan Palkhi Rath Yatra, Gopalkala, Mahavir jayanti, Vishwakarma Jayanti, Eid, Buddhapornima and Christmas as well. Ganesh Mandir in Bajar patangan is well known in the surrounding area. Common surnames in Vaduj are Jagdale, Godse, Kale, Phadtare, Yeole & shah.
Vaduj is also famous for 'Quit india Movement' held in 1942.
Parshuram Gharge, Born on 27 October 1901 at Vadagaon, dist. Satara, Maharashtra, was an active Congress worker. The Gandhian slogan 'Do Or Die' and the arrest of all the top national leaders before the launching of the 'Quit India' movement on 8 August 1942 galvanized the local activists in Satara so much that they lost no time in plunging themselves into the nationwide agitation against the British imperialism. In one such anti-British demonstration that Parshuram Gharge himself led in Khatav taluka, Satara, on 9 September 1942, more than 2000 people marched towards the Vaduz Cutcherry singing patriotic songs and crying nationalist slogans and hoisting the tricolor Congress flags . The local British officials tried to turn them away but the marchers went ahead, leading to the police firing on the non-violent crowd, and resulting in the death of Parshuram Gharge on the spot.

Nearby tourist attractions
 Shri Ganesh Mandir at Ganeshwadi(Vaduj) - 2 km
 Janubai Madir at Satewadi-3 km
 Bhavani Mata Mandir at Pingaljai - 6 km
 Yerala Dam at Yeralwadi – 6 km
 Janubai mandir Hingane - 5 km
 Mayani Bird Sanctuary – 24 km
 Yamai Devi Mandir & Aundh Museum – 18 km
 Gondavale – 16 km
 Bhavling (Gursale) – 7 km
 Siddeshwar Kuroli – 10 km
 Pusegaon - 20 km
 Wakeshwar (Bhairavnath Mandir)- 4 km
 Dahiwadi - 18 km
 Karad - 48 km
 Mhaswad - 50 km
 Vita - 45 km

Hospitals
 Government Gramin Hospital, Vaduj
 Datta Hospital (Dr. B.J. Katkar), Vaduj
 Spandan Hospital (Dr. Sandesh Galande), Vaduj
 Accident Hospital (Dr. Ajit Inamdar), Vaduj
 Charushila Hospital (Dr. Vivekanand Mane), Vaduj
 Saddichaa Hospital (Dr. Santosh More), Vaduj

Developing Areas
 Balwant Park (Vaduj-Ganeshwadi, Road)
 Vaduj-Katarkhatav Road
 Vaduj-Karad Road
Vaduj -Hingane Rode
 Vaduj-Pedgaon Road
 Vaduj Dahiwadi Road
 Vaduj Pusegaon Road

References

Cities and towns in Satara district